Steve Mears is the television play-by-play voice of the Pittsburgh Penguins on AT&T SportsNet Pittsburgh.

Early life and education 
Steve Mears grew up in Murrysville, Pennsylvania where he attended Franklin Regional High School. He then attended college at Bowling Green State University where he was the play-by-play voice of the BGSU Falcons. He graduated from Bowling Green State University in 2002.

Career

Central Hockey League and NHL radio broadcasting
Mears served as director of media relations and broadcasting for the Bossier-Shreveport Mudbugs of the Central Hockey League from 2002–2006. He was named the Central Hockey League Broadcaster of the Year in 2005.
In the summer of 2006, Mears accepted a position as the radio play-by-play broadcaster for the New York Islanders of the National Hockey League. Mears made his NHL broadcasting debut on October 5, 2006, during a New York Islanders vs Phoenix Coyotes game. Mears stayed with the Islanders for three seasons before joining the Pittsburgh Penguins Radio Network. He served four seasons with the Penguins, covering their radio and TV game broadcasts, hosting "Penguins Live" on Pittsburgh Penguins 24/7 Radio, and contributing to PensTV on the official team website.

NHL Network
In 2012, Mears made his NHL Network debut when he provided coverage of the 2012 NHL Stanley Cup Playoffs and Stanley Cup Final. Mears officially joined the NHL Network team in February 2013 as the co-host of NHL Now. During the hockey season, Mears hosted NHL Now! from 4:00–6:00 PM EST Monday-Friday on the NHL Network alongside E.J. Hradek and Michelle McMahon. Aside from NHL Now, Mears also anchored video segments for NHL.com and called play-by-play for the IIHF World Junior Championships.

Pittsburgh Penguins
On May 16, 2017, Mears was named the play-by-play television announcer for broadcasts on AT&T SportsNet for Pittsburgh Penguins games, replacing Paul Steigerwald.

3ICE
Starting with the inaugural 2022 summer season, Mears was the play-by-play announcer for 3ICE on CBS Sports.

References

1980 births
Living people
National Hockey League broadcasters
Pittsburgh Penguins announcers
Bowling Green State University alumni
People from Murrysville, Pennsylvania